Bearsville may refer to:
 Bearsville, New York, a hamlet in Ulster County, New York
 Bearsville Records, an American record label active from 1970 to 1984
 Bearsville Studios, a recording studio in Bearsville, New York

See also
 Bearville (disambiguation)